The Northern District is  a subregion of the Colombian Department of Caldas.

Aguadas
Aranzazu
Pacora
Salamina

References 

Subregions of Caldas Department